Creature Crunch is a 1996 animated point-and-click adventure game released for personal computers, developed by TechToons and Class6 Interactive. In the game, the player controls Wesley, a boy who is transformed into a human-monster hybrid by a mad scientist. Wesley has to escape the scientist's mansion, exploring its rooms and eating items which will help him defeat each room's guardians.

Creature Crunch features the voices of comedians Martin Short and Eugene Levy.

Plot 
The boy Wesley (voiced by Short) is riding his bike during a storm. He stops in front of a mansion looking for shelter. Wesley is captured by the house's owner, Dr. Drod, and becomes the subject of his monster experiment. The experiment goes wrong, turning the boy only a half-monster. With the help of Brian (Levy), a sentient brain in a jar, Wesley has to find a way out Dr. Drod's mansion and defeat another experiments who block his way.

By eating the right items scattered by the mansion Wesley can transform himself into a variety of forms (e.g. Wesley eats a Bunsen burner and turns into a fire-breathing monster) who help him defeat the enemies.

Reception 
Entertainment Weekly's Bob Strauss described the Creature Crunch as "passably enjoyable". The game artwork reminded him of John Kricfalusi style.

References

External links
 Official Website
 Creature Crunch on Internet Archive
 Creature Crunch on Moby Games
 

1996 video games
Video games developed in the United States
Windows games
Point-and-click adventure games